Patrick G. Morales (born October 21, 1993), better known by his stage name Wiki, is an American rapper and record producer from New York City, New York. He was once a member of New York City-based hip hop group Ratking with rapper-producer Sporting Life and rapper Hak until 2015. Morales was also a member of Secret Circle with rapper Antwon and rapper-producer Lil Ugly Mane until 2018. He has since released three solo albums; No Mountains in Manhattan (2017), Oofie (2019), and Half God (2021).

Biography
Wiki was raised in the Upper West Side in Manhattan. He attended the Brooklyn Friends School, and is of Puerto Rican ancestry on his father's side and Irish-American on his mother's side. His mother grew up in the Westchester County suburb of New York.

He began his music career in 2011 as a member of the New York City hip hop group Ratking with Hak and Sporting Life. In a 2012 interview, he stated that his rap name is an allusion to Wikipedia. Wiki released his debut solo extended play 1993 on October 2, 2011. 1993 was later re-released as Ratking's debut extended play Wiki93 on November 2, 2012. Ratking released their debut single "100" on November 18, 2013. They then released their debut studio album So It Goes on April 7, 2014. Ratking released their second extended play 700-Fill on March 4, 2015.

Wiki released his debut solo mixtape Lil Me on December 7, 2015. Wiki and fellow rapper Your Old Droog released their collaborative extended play What Happened to Fire? on February 2, 2017. Wiki's debut solo album No Mountains in Manhattan was released on August 25, 2017. The album is named after a line from the 1973 Martin Scorsese film Mean Streets.

Wiki lives with his girlfriend in Park Slope, Brooklyn.

Discography

Studio albums

Extended plays

Mixtapes

Singles

As lead artist

As featured artist

Guest appearances

References

External links
 Official website

Living people
1993 births
American male rappers
Rappers from Manhattan
Puerto Rican rappers
American hip hop record producers
XL Recordings artists
21st-century American rappers
Record producers from New York (state)
21st-century American male musicians
People from Park Slope
People from the Upper West Side
Brooklyn Friends School alumni
Hispanic and Latino American rappers